Henri Le Chêne (1891-?) was a French Special Operations Executive agent during the Second World War.

Early life 
Henri Le Chêne was born in London in 1891, the son of French parents. In 1922 his parents retired and returned to France. He worked as a hotel proprietor and an administrator in Kenya.

World War II 
During the German invasion in 1940, Henri, his younger brother Pierre, and his wife Marie-Thérèse left France for England on the last boat leaving from Bayonne.

He joined the Special Operations Executive along with Marie-Thérèse, while Pierre joined subsequently.

On 22 April 1942 he was landed in France to become organiser of the SPRUCE network in the Lyons area.  His wife Marie-Thérèse later joined him as courier. After his first visit to Virginia Hall he decided that Lyons was unsafe and changed his area to Clermont-Ferrand and Périgueux. 
In December 1942 following the arrest of his some of his network and also his brother Pierre, he decided to return to the UK via the Pyrenees. Too tired to join him, his wife hid in friends' homes and was evacuated by the SOE from Angers on 19 August 1943. Back in England, she rejoined her husband.

Post-war 
He and his wife returned to France in 1946 and opened a hotel in Sainte-Menehould in collaboration with his brother Pierre.

References

Further reading 

 MRD Foot, SOE in France an account of the work of the British Special Operations Executive in France, 1940–1944, HMSO, London, 1966.
 Sir Brooks Richards, "Secret Flotillas - Clandestine Links in France and North Africa, 1940-1944", MDV, 2001.
 EG Boxshall, Chronology of SOE operations with the resistance in France during World War II, 1960.

1891 births
British Special Operations Executive personnel
Year of death missing
French expatriates in the United Kingdom
French expatriates in Kenya